Jacek Wojciech Gmoch (born 13 January 1939 in Pruszków) is a former Polish footballer, who later became a trainer and manager of the Poland National Team.

While having a successful football career he graduated in communication from the Warsaw University of Technology. Gmoch begun playing for Znicz Pruszków, later moving on for a successful career at Legia Warsaw. With Legia, he won the Polish Cup twice (in 1964 and 1966) and contributed to the beginning of the successful 1968–69 season. He also became a player for the national Team of Poland (29 caps).

Following a major injury in a friendly match, Gmoch began a coaching career, starting in Legia Warsaw in 1969–71. Having been offered the Poland National Team assistant's job by Kazimierz Górski, he lasted from 1971–74. Together they achieved an Olympic Gold medal in Munich 1972, as well as 3rd Place in the 1974 World Cup. He moved to the U.S. to follow his scientific career at the University of Pennsylvania (1975–6). He returned to International football in 1976 to qualify the National Team of Poland to the 1978 Mundial in Argentina (fifth place). He later moved to Norway in 1979 and Greece until 2003 where he became one of the most successful and recognised coaches.

In Norway, he became Skeid Fotball manager and then he went to Greece and worked first as a manager of PAS Giannina, Apollon Athens, Larisa,. In 1983, he did his big step as a manager and became trainer of Panathinaikos. In his first season as Panathinaikos manager, his team won the Double and the following season, his team for second time in their history, reached the Semi finals of European Champions Cup, where they were eliminated by Liverpool. For the 1985–86 season, he became coach of another great Greek club, AEK and the following season he became again trainer of Larisa and in 1988, his team historically won their first and only Greek Championship. After Larisa, he worked as a manager for Olympiacos and Aris Thessaloniki, in 1991 he went to Cyprus to become APOEL trainer, where his team won the championship and cup. He remained there until the middle of the season 1992–93. Later, he worked for Athinaikos (1994–95), Ethnikos Piraeus (1995–96), Ionikos (1997–98), Kalamata (1998–99), Panionios (1999), and again for Ionikos in 2002–03.

He acted as a member of the Polish Olympic representation team in Athens 2004 Summer Olympics and later became a minor shareholder and President of Legia Warsaw, as well as following up a career in television commentating for several networks. He notably commentated Champions League matches for the Greek Television ERT, as well as International Tournaments in Poland for channels Polsat and TVP.

On 15 November 2010, Gmoch took over as the caretaker manager of Panathinaikos, following Nikos Nioplias, who resigned after a string of mediocre results in the first part of the 2010–11 season. As caretaker manager he successfully won against Iraklis in his only final match before being succeeded by the new manager of the team. The score was 4–2. The stadium crowd lauded him.

Managerial Statistics
As of 21 November 2010

Managerial record by team and tenure

Honours

Player

Legia Warsaw

 Ekstraklasa: 1968-69
 Ekstraklasa runner-up: 1960, 1967-68
 Polish Cup: 1964, 1966

Assistant Manager

Poland

 Summer Olympics Gold: 1972
 FIFA World Cup 3rd place: 1974

Manager

Poland

 FIFA World Cup 5th place: 1978

AEL

 Super League Greece: 1987-88
 Super League Greece runner-up: 1982-83

Panathinaikos

 Super League Greece: 1983-84
 Super League Greece runner-up: 1984-85
 Greek Cup: 1983-84
 European Cup Semi Finals: 1984-85

Olympiacos

 Super League Greece runner-up: 1988-89

APOEL

 Cypriot First Division: 1991-92
 Cypriot Cup: 1992-93
 Cypriot Super Cup: 1992-93, 1996-97

References

External links
 Znicz Pruszków 

1939 births
Living people
People from Pruszków
Warsaw University of Technology alumni
Polish footballers
Poland international footballers
Polish football managers
Polish expatriate football managers
Association football defenders
Znicz Pruszków players
Legia Warsaw players
Ekstraklasa players
Expatriate football managers in Norway
Expatriate football managers in Greece
PAS Giannina F.C. managers
AEK Athens F.C. managers
Super League Greece managers
Expatriate football managers in Cyprus
Association football chairmen and investors
Athlitiki Enosi Larissa F.C. managers
Olympiacos F.C. managers
Aris Thessaloniki F.C. managers
Greek people of Polish descent
Panathinaikos F.C. managers
1978 FIFA World Cup managers
Poland national football team managers
Panionios F.C. managers
Ionikos F.C. managers
APOEL FC managers
Apollon Smyrnis F.C. managers
Commanders of the Order of Merit of the Republic of Poland
Knights of the Order of Polonia Restituta
Sportspeople from Masovian Voivodeship